Linn Valley is a city in Linn County, Kansas, United States.  As of the 2020 census, the population of the city was 956.

History
Linn Valley had its start in the 1970s as a planned community centered around a lake. It was incorporated as a city in 1998.

Geography
Linn Valley is located at  (38.377582, -94.709143).

Demographics

2010 census
As of the census of 2010, there were 804 people, 360 households, and 255 families residing in the city. The racial makeup of the city was 96.1% White, 0.1% African American, 1.2% Native American, 0.4% Asian, 0.1% from other races, and 2.0% from two or more races. Hispanic or Latino of any race were 1.4% of the population.

There were 360 households, of which 21.7% had children under the age of 18 living with them, 59.7% were married couples living together, 6.4% had a female householder with no husband present, 4.7% had a male householder with no wife present, and 29.2% were non-families. 27.5% of all households were made up of individuals, and 10% had someone living alone who was 65 years of age or older. The average household size was 2.23 and the average family size was 2.65.

The median age in the city was 50.9 years. 18.7% of residents were under the age of 18; 4% were between the ages of 18 and 24; 18.9% were from 25 to 44; 33.3% were from 45 to 64; and 25.1% were 65 years of age or older. The gender makeup of the city was 52.7% male and 47.3% female.

2000 census
As of the census of 2000, there were 562 people, 238 households, and 178 families residing in the city. The racial makeup of the city was 95.02% White, 1.60% African American, 0.53% Native American, 0.18% Asian, 0.36% from other races, and 2.31% from two or more races. Hispanic or Latino of any race were 3.56% of the population.

There were 238 households, out of which 19.3% had children under the age of 18 living with them, 70.2% were married couples living together, 2.5% had a female householder with no husband present, and 25.2% were non-families. 19.3% of all households were made up of individuals, and 9.2% had someone living alone who was 65 years of age or older. The average household size was 2.36 and the average family size was 2.67.

In the city, the population was spread out, with 19.9% under the age of 18, 5.2% from 18 to 24, 21.2% from 25 to 44, 32.7% from 45 to 64, and 21.0% who were 65 years of age or older. The median age was 48 years. For every 100 females, there were 112.9 males. For every 100 females age 18 and over, there were 108.3 males.

The median income for a household in the city was $31,094, and the median income for a family was $34,500. Males had a median income of $30,972 versus $24,375 for females. The per capita income for the city was $18,479. About 5.1% of families and 8.9% of the population were below the poverty line, including 20.4% of those under age 18 and 7.1% of those age 65 or over.

Education
The community is served by Prairie View USD 362 public school district.

References

Further reading

External links
 City of Linn Valley 
 Linn Valley - Directory of Public Officials 
 Linn Valley city map, KDOT

Cities in Kansas
Cities in Linn County, Kansas
1998 establishments in Kansas